The 1st World Science Fiction Convention (Worldcon) was held on 2–4 July 1939 in the Caravan Hall in New York City, United States, in conjunction with the New York World's Fair, which was themed as "The World of Tomorrow". It was later retroactively named "NyCon I" by Forrest J Ackerman.

The convention was chaired by Sam Moskowitz. Along with Moskowitz, other organizers were James V. Taurasi, Sr. and Will Sykora.

Participants 

Attendance was approximately 200.

Guests of Honor 

The Guest of Honor at the first Worldcon was Frank R. Paul.

Other notable participants 

Also attending were John W. Campbell, Isaac Asimov, L. Sprague de Camp, Ray Bradbury, Hannes Bok, Milton A. Rothman, John D. Clark, Jack Williamson, and Harry Harrison.

Controversy 

In addition to its groundbreaking role as the first of its kind, the convention was noteworthy for the exclusion of a number of politicized Futurians by convention chair Sam Moskowitz; those excluded were Donald A. Wollheim, Frederik Pohl, John Michel, Robert A. W. Lowndes, Cyril M. Kornbluth, and Jack Gillespie, an event known to fannish historians as "The Great Exclusion Act."

According to Pohl, in his autobiography The Way the Future Was, the Futurians held their own counter-convention which was attended by several who went to the regular convention. He also downplayed the aspect that politics played, himself believing that it was a personality conflict between the convention organizers and the Futurians and said "We pretty nearly had it coming," continuing with "What we Futurians made very clear to the rest of New York fandom was that we thought we were better than they were. For some reason that annoyed them."

Programming and events 

Ackerman and his girlfriend and fellow fanzine editor Myrtle R Douglas (Morojo) attended the convention in "futuristicostumes" designed and sewn by Douglas: this is considered a forerunner to modern fan costuming (which is known as "cosplay").

In 1994, the International Costumers' Guild (ICG) presented a special award to Ackerman recognizing him as the "Father of Convention Costuming" at Conadian, the 52nd Worldcon. In 2016, the ICG recognized Morojo as the “Mother of Convention Costuming” with a video award presentation at MidAmeriCon II, the 74th Worldcon.

Awards

1939 Retro Hugo Awards 

Hugo Awards were not presented, as the first ones were awarded in 1953. However, in 2014 at the 72nd World Science Fiction Convention held in London, a set of Retro Hugo Awards were presented to honor work that would have been Hugo-eligible had the award existed in 1939:

 Best Novel: The Sword in the Stone by T. H. White
 Best Novella: "Who Goes There?" by John W. Campbell (as "Don A. Stuart")
 Best Novelette: "Rule 18" by Clifford D. Simak
 Best Short Story: "How We Went to Mars" by Arthur C. Clarke
 Best Dramatic Presentation: The War of the Worlds by H. G. Wells, written for radio by Howard E. Koch and Anne Froelick, directed by Orson Welles (The Mercury Theatre on the Air/CBS)
 Best Professional Editor: John W. Campbell
 Best Professional Artist: Virgil Finlay
 Best Fanzine: Imagination!, edited by Forrest J Ackerman, Myrtle Rebecca "Morojo" Douglas, and T. Bruce Yerke
 Best Fan Writer: Ray Bradbury
 Special Committee Award: Jerry Siegel and Joe Shuster, creators of Superman

See also 
 World Science Fiction Society

References

Further reading 

 In Memory Yet Green by Isaac Asimov (1979)
 The Futurians by Damon Knight (1977)
 The Way The Future Was by Frederik Pohl (1978)

External links 

 World Science Fiction Society
 NYcon 1 - 1939 WorldCon

1939 New York World's Fair
1939 conferences
1939 in New York City
July 1939 events
Science fiction conventions in the United States
Worldcon